Dmitry Itskov (Russian: Дмитрий Ицков) is a Russian entrepreneur, billionaire and the founder of New Media Stars, a web-based media company. He has made a reported £1bn from his Moscow-based news publishing company. Itskov is best known for being the founder of the 2045 Initiative, which aims to achieve cybernetic immortality by the year 2045. Itskov started his foundation in 2011.

Itskov said, in a 2016 BBC Horizon TV documentary, that the "ultimate goal of [his] plan is to transfer someone’s personality into the new artificial carrier."

See also
 Transhumanism
 2045 Initiative
 Immortality

References

Russian billionaires
Russian mass media owners
Life extensionists
Living people
Russian transhumanists
Year of birth missing (living people)
Plekhanov Russian University of Economics alumni